XBlock is the SDK for the edX MOOC platform, written in Python, and announced and released publicly on March 14, 2013. It aims to enable the global software development community to participate in the construction of the edX educational platform and the next generation of online and blended courses.

References

External links
 XBlock documentation

Free content management systems
Free learning management systems
Free learning support software
Free software programmed in Python
Software using the GNU AGPL license
Virtual learning environments